Aegis is the oldest high school newspaper in California. It was founded in 1886 at Oakland High School, in Oakland, California 

The newspaper puts out occasional print issues, but mostly publishes content on its website.

In the 1890s, Jack London wrote for the publication, and these stories were later collected into a book called The Aegis.

See also
Oakland High School (Oakland, California)
 List of Oakland, California high schools

References

Mass media in Oakland, California
Student newspapers published in California
Publications established in 1886
1886 establishments in California
19th century in Oakland, California